Taxi Driver is the first album by Dynamic Duo, released in 2004. The album features guest vocals from Brown Eyed Soul, Drunken Tiger, TBNY, Lisa, Bobby Kim, Eun Ji Won, Epik High, Asoto Union and other Korean artists.

Track listing 
이력서 
Taxi Driver Interlude 1 
두남자 (feat. Brown eyed soul)
실례합니다 (feat. DJ Wrecks, Tablo) 
Pride (feat. The Name, Double K, Verbal Jint) 
Taxidriver interlude 2 
신나? (우리가 누구?) feat. lisa 
Skit 
사랑하면 버려야 할 아까운 것들 feat. 성훈 of Brown eyed soul 
Superstar (behind the Scene) feat. Tiger jk, sean2slow, dj tukutz 
비극 Part 1 feat. k.o.d 
무인도 feat. lazy 
불면증 feat. bobby kim
Ring My Bell feat. 나얼 of Brown eyed soul 
우리는 바보 (Shake ya 엉덩 to da 이) 
My World feat. yankie of TBNY 
Outro
Candy[Hidden Track](feat. Brown Eyed Soul)

References

2004 albums
Dynamic Duo albums